Márcio Ivanildo da Silva (born 25 March 1981), known as Marcinho, is a Brazilian footballer who plays for Cajazeirense as an attacking midfielder.

Club career

Brazil / Marítimo
In his country, Marcinho started playing for Campo Limpo and Associação Desportiva São Caetano. In January 2004 he joined Clube de Regatas Brasil and then was loaned out to Santos FC, with which he competed in the Série A in the 2004 season, starting in only three of his appearances but contributing relatively to the national championship conquest.

Marcinho arrived in Portugal in January 2005, signing with C.S. Marítimo. During his spell in Madeira he never appeared in less than 27 Primeira Liga games when playing complete seasons, his best output being six goals in 29 matches in 2008–09 as his team finished in ninth position; he also competed in that year's UEFA Cup, scoring in a 1–2 first round away loss against Valencia CF (1–3 on aggregate).

APOEL
In late December 2009 Marcinho signed with APOEL FC in the Cypriot First Division, amidst interest of French teams Le Mans Union Club 72 and Grenoble Foot 38. He netted seven times from 25 appearances in his first full campaign, as the Nicosia-based side won the national championship.

Marcinho appeared in 11 matches in the 2011–12 UEFA Champions League, in the club's surprising quarter-finals run in the competition. The 31-year-old was released in late May 2012, after his contract was not renewed.

Later years
On 19 June 2012, Marcinho signed for one year with PFC Levski Sofia in Bulgaria. On 14 June of the following year, he agreed to a one-year deal with Cyprus' Anorthosis Famagusta FC.

Honours
Santos
Série A: 2004

APOEL
Cypriot First Division: 2010–11
Cypriot Super Cup: 2011

Botafogo-PB
Campeonato Paraibano: 2017

References

External links
 
 Futpédia profile 
 
 
 

1981 births
Living people
Brazilian footballers
Association football midfielders
Campeonato Brasileiro Série A players
Campeonato Brasileiro Série C players
Campeonato Brasileiro Série D players
Associação Desportiva São Caetano players
Clube de Regatas Brasil players
Santos FC players
Agremiação Sportiva Arapiraquense players
Murici Futebol Clube players
Botafogo Futebol Clube (PB) players
Primeira Liga players
C.S. Marítimo players
Cypriot First Division players
APOEL FC players
Anorthosis Famagusta F.C. players
First Professional Football League (Bulgaria) players
PFC Levski Sofia players
Campinense Clube players
Associação Atlética de Altos players
Brazilian expatriate footballers
Expatriate footballers in Portugal
Expatriate footballers in Cyprus
Expatriate footballers in Bulgaria
Brazilian expatriate sportspeople in Portugal
Brazilian expatriate sportspeople in Cyprus